Events in the year 2022 in Puerto Rico.

Incumbents 

 President: Joe Biden (D)
 Governor: Pedro Pierluisi (D)
 Resident Commissioner: Jenniffer González

Events

January to April 

 January 18 – A federal judge signs a plan to restructure Puerto Rico's economy, allowing it to start repaying debt to creditors and lifting it out of bankruptcy.
 March 15 – Puerto Rican government-debt crisis: Puerto Rico exits out of bankruptcy after completing the largest public debt restructuring in U.S. history.
 April 7 – Around two million people in Puerto Rico are left without electricity after a fire occurs at one of the island's largest power plants.
 May 12 – Eleven people die and thirty-one others are rescued after a boat capsizes off the coast of Puerto Rico near Desecheo Island.
 May 22 – Five people are shot dead at a public housing complex in Caimito, San Juan.
 July 1 – Puero Rico reports its first case of monkeypox.
 September 18 – Hurricane Fiona makes landfall in Puerto Rico causing the entire island to lose power. The U.S. National Hurricane Center warns of "life-threatening flash flooding" on the island amid "historic" rainfall.

Deaths 

 January 4 – Julio Ferrer, 68,  Olympic sprinter (1976)
 January 18 – Tito Matos, 53,  requinto player
 January 26 – Juan Báez, 86, Olympic basketball player (1960, 1964)
 February 3 – Dean Zayas, 83, actor, director, and playwright
 February 9 – 
 Luz Odilia Font, 92, actress
 Juan R. Melecio Machuca, 87, lawyer, director of the Office of Legislative Services (1981–1988)
 April 16 – Mariano Ortiz, 77, Olympic basketball player (1968, 1972, 1976)
 May 13 – Carlos Ortiz, 85, Hall of Fame boxer, world super lightweight (1959–1960) and WBA/WBC lightweight champion (1962–1965, 1965–1968)
 July 1 – Joe Hatton, 74, Olympic basketball player (1968, 1972)
 July 5 – José Vicente, 100, Olympic pole vaulter (1948, 1952)
 July 17 – Héctor Tricoche, 66, salsa singer-songwriter
 August 18 – Milt Ramírez, 72, baseball player (St. Louis Cardinals, Oakland Athletics)

See also 

2022 in Central America
2022 Atlantic hurricane season
2020s

References 

 
2020s in Puerto Rico
Years of the 21st century in Puerto Rico
Puerto Rico
Puerto Rico